Lew Douglas  (August 25, 1912 – November 11, 1997) was an American composer, arranger, and conductor.

Background
Born in Grand Rapids, Michigan, Douglas was in the Army during the second world war and became an arranger and conductor for some of the U.S. Army swing bands. After completing his military service, he moved to Chicago, where he continued his musical education at the Chicago Conservatory of Music. He started arranging for big bands such as Ted Weems, Eddy Howard and Dan Belloc. Douglas was taken on by NBC to be one of the staff arrangers for many TV shows, including "Dave Garroway at Large," and "Your Show of Shows."  Subsequently, Douglas moved on to be head arranger and producer for Mercury Records in Chicago and he was involved in many major hits that included "Kisses Sweeter than Wine" by The Weavers, "The Bible Tells Me So," performed by Nick Noble and the Lew Douglas Orchestra; "Two Hearts, Two Kisses," sung by Pat Boone, "Bewitched, Bothered and Bewildered" by Bill Snyder and Patti Page's "Confess."

Songwriting
Famously he is quoted as saying "My first love is arranging and producing, but when I get stuck for a song, I write one."
He is most noted for three major compositions in the 1950s. In January 1953, Douglas had the #1 song, "Why Don't You Believe Me?" sung by Joni James, The #10 song, "Have You Heard?", again by Joni James, and the #13 song, "Pretend",  sung by Nat King Cole.

Discography

As arranger
With Ramsey Lewis
Country Meets the Blues (Argo, 1962)

References

External links
Discography

1912 births
1997 deaths
American male composers
American music arrangers
American male conductors (music)
20th-century American conductors (music)
20th-century American composers
20th-century American male musicians
United States Army personnel of World War II